The Precision Integrated-Optics Near-infrared Imaging ExpeRiment (PIONIER) is a visiting instrument at the ESO's Paranal Observatory, part of the VLTI astronomical observatory. It combines the light from four telescopes simultaneously and provide 0.001 arc seconds of angular resolution, the equivalent angular resolution of a 100 m telescope.

PIONIER has been built at LAOG and has been installed at VLTI in November 2010. After few nights of commissioning, it is now routinely delivering science data.

See also
 Lists of telescopes

References

External links 
  IPAG (Grenoble) - PIONIER project home
  OSUG Grenoble – PIONIER instrument
  ESO PIONIER – instrument description
  ESO VLTI – about the interferometer at the VLT

Astronomical observatories in Chile
Telescope instruments
Interferometric telescopes